The Liubu Bridge is a historic stone arch bridge over the  in Ziyang Subdistrict, Shangcheng District of Hangzhou, Zhejiang, China.

Etymology
Liubu Bridge is named after the fact that its west was facing the twenty-four court offices of the Six Ministries, and its east was Duting Posthouse, so it was also called Duting Posthouse Bridge during the Southern Song dynasty.

History
The original temple dates back to the Southern Song dynasty (1127–1279). It historically known as Tonghui Bridge in the Yuan dynasty (1271–1368), Jinyun Bridge in the Ming dynasty (1368–1644), and reverted to its former name of Liubu Bridge in the Qing dynasty (1644–1911). The current bridge was rebuilt in 1984. In July 2000, it has been designated as a municipal-level cultural heritage site by the Government of Hangzhou.

Gallery

References

Bridges in Zhejiang
Arch bridges in China
Bridges completed in 1984
Buildings and structures completed in 1984
1984 establishments in China